The Wiley Hose Company Building is located in Catskill, New York.  The three story, brick building is a representative example of a turn-of-the-century firehouse.  It was built in 1900 by George W. Holdridge, a local builder.  The brick was produced in the Catskill area, and is complemented by stone and terra cotta detailing.  The firehouse was altered somewhat around 1930 to accommodate the newer, larger mechanized fire equipment that replaced horse-drawn and smaller mechanized equipment.  The matching entry porticos on either side were added at this time, and the wooden flooring in the equipment bay was replaced with concrete.

The West Catskill fire district served by this firehouse was founded in 1855.  At that time, it was called the West Catskill Fire Company.  In 1893, the company was renamed after the owner of the Kaatskill Knitting Company, General W.S.C. Wiley.  In 1902 it was renamed again and subsequently called Hose Company No. 1.  The building was used as an active firehouse until 1971.

The Wiley Hose Company was added to the National Register of Historic Places in 1995.

References

Fire stations completed in 1900
Fire stations on the National Register of Historic Places in New York (state)
Defunct fire stations in New York (state)
Buildings and structures in Greene County, New York
National Register of Historic Places in Greene County, New York
Catskill, New York